Rushikonda is a neighbourhood situated on Visakhapatnam and Bheemili road. Visakhapatnam Metropolitan Region  Development Authority undertakes the development activities related to infrastructure and tourism.

Transport

APSRTC routes

See also 

 Fintech Valley Vizag

References

Tourist attractions in Visakhapatnam
Beaches of Andhra Pradesh
Neighbourhoods in Visakhapatnam
Uttarandhra